Fernando César de Souza (born 12 September 1980 in Jardinopolis) is a footballer from Brazil who plays as a defender. He has spent much of his playing career in the Swiss Super League.

References

External links
Profile, A
Swiss Football League
FC St Gallen profile

1980 births
Brazilian footballers
Brazilian expatriate footballers
Living people
SC Kriens players
FC Schaffhausen players
FC St. Gallen players
Comercial Futebol Clube (Ribeirão Preto) players
Esporte Clube Internacional de Lages players
Swiss Super League players
Expatriate footballers in Switzerland
Footballers from São Paulo (state)
Association football defenders